E. Thomas may refer to:

 E. Thomas, an Italian fabric mill
 People with given name abbreviated "E." and surname Thomas
 Earle Thomas, New Zealand international footballer
 Edward Thomas (disambiguation), multiple people
 Edwin Thomas (disambiguation), multiple people
 Elizabeth Thomas (disambiguation), multiple people
 Eric Thomas (disambiguation), multiple people